George B. Bruce was an American Army drum major during the Civil War. Bruce is best known for co-writing The Drummer's and Fifer's Guide with Daniel Decatur Emmett.

Career
George Bruce was taught to play the drum by drum major Riggs in the Baltimore area. Bruce served in the Maryland Dragoons from 1839-1843. Bruce's book, The Guide was published in 1862, and remains well known as a source for music for the fife and drum. It was the second book in history to use the word "rudiment" in conjunction with short, named exercises for the snare drum, the first being Charles Stewart Ashworth's A New Useful and Complete System of Drum Beating. The book also was one of the first to advocate playing rudiments Open, closed, open, a practice method popular today, and the first to record the Flamacue. According to the cover of his book Bruce served in the 7th Regiment N.Y.S.M. (National Guard) Band  and was (potentially dubiously) also listed as the Principal Drum Instructor at Bedloe's and the U.S. Army at the Eastern School of Practice on Governor's Island in New York Harbor.  Bruce was a player of the drums, banjo, violin and mandolin. Bruce served as the drum major for the 22nd New York Infantry Regiment in 1863 and as the drum major for the 5th Maryland Infantry Regiment. He died in 1884 in Baltimore City, MD at the age of 68.

His work influenced Sanford A. Moeller of the Moeller Method of drumming, in the publisher's note of Moeller's own book he speaks highly Bruce's method of drum instruction, and indeed, Moeller's book has some similarity to Bruce and Emmett's The Drummers' and Fifers' Guide, in that both have lengthy treatments of the rudiments, and many of the pieces in Bruce's book also appear in Moeller's. Moeller is quoted as having said that Bruce and Emmett, "saved American drumming."

Controversy
George Bruce's resume and qualifications have been questioned by some modern groups, though many publications on rudimental drumming adhere to Bruce's own account of his qualifications. It has been stated that Bruce's birth name was George B. Barrett (b. 1815 or 1816 in Baltimore) and that he changed his name  after deserting his post in Maryland's 2nd Regiment of Dragoons in 1836. A soldier named George Barrett served in the 7th Regiment N.Y.S.M. as Bruce had claimed to do, and Bruce served under his new name as a drum major in the 22nd Regiment N.Y.S.M., though his post with the 22nd is not listed in his book. The drum and fife instructors on Governor's Island during the Civil War were known to be Sergeant Henke and Sergeant Michael Moore, of the eponymous Henke-Moore Manuscript, and not George Bruce as he claimed. Moore had been at Governor's Island since 1841. Fort Wood on Bedloe's Island, now known as Liberty Island, was an ordinance depot during the Civil War. The question as to Bruce's backstory had been raised in the 1920s but was largely ignored by contemporary drummers.

References

 
 Nexus Percussion: Music for Fife and Field Drums
 Civil War Bands and Their Music

External links
Index of songs in ''The Drummer's and Fifer's Guide

American non-fiction writers
American drummers
American male drummers
1816 births
1884 deaths